Mohd Yadzil Yaakub (born 14 April 1978) is a Malaysian politician and medical doctor from the Malaysian United Indigenous Party (BERSATU), a component party of the Perikatan Nasional (BN) coalition who has served as State Leader of the Opposition of Melaka since December 2022 and Member of the Melaka State Legislative Assembly (MLA) for Bemban since November 2021. In BERSATU, he has served as State Chairman of Melaka since December 2021, Division Chairman of Jasin since 2020 and served as State Deputy Chairman of Melaka from 2021 to December 2021. In PN, he has also served as State Chairman of Melaka since January 2022 and served as State Deputy Chairman of Melaka from 2021 to January 2022 and Election Director of 2021 Melaka state election. He is also one of the only two Melaka Opposition, PN and BERSATU MLAs.

Political career

On 17 November 2021, Yadzil, PN candidate for the Bemban state seat  expressed his confidence in advancing and progressing Bemban. On 20 November 2021, Yadzil was elected into Melaka State Legislative Assembly, winning the Bemban seat from Wong Fort Pin of the Pakatan Harapan (PH) opposition coalition. On 14 December 2021, he was named the State Chairman of PN and BERSATU, replacing Mohd Rafiq Naizamohideen, former EXCO member and former Paya Rumput MLA who lost his reelection in the state election. On 17 December 2021, Yadzil said he would leave the political affiliations of himself and another PN MLA, Sungai Udang MLA Mohd Aleef Yusof to PN chairman and BERSATU president Muhyiddin Yassin to decide whether they are affiliated with the government or opposition. Muhyiddin decided that they are to be affiliated with the opposition. On 27 January 2022, he was appointed as the State Chairman of Melaka of PN. On 12 December 2022, he as the State Melaka PN and BERSATU Chairman, was expected to take over as State Leader of the Opposition of Melaka from Bukit Katil MLA Adly Zahari of PH after Chief Minister Sulaiman Md Ali confirmed that PH had joined the state government as strategic partners and the Opposition was then left with only two PN MLAs who are Yadzil and Sungai Udang MLA Mohd Aleef Yusof. This has increased the number of state government MLAs to 26 and strengthened the majority support commanded by the state government led by Sulaiman. The following day on 13 December 2022, he officially did so.

Non-governmental organisation and other careers
Yadzil has been patron of the Pertubuhan Gagasan Inovasi dan Ekonomi Melaka (GIEM) since 2020. He has also been co-chairman of Innovation and Digitalisation Committee of SME Corp of Malaysia and corporation member of SME Corp of Malaysia since 2021. He was secretary of the Melaka branch of the Koperasi Pribumi Bersatu Malaysia Sdn Bhd in 2019 and medical officer of Melaka hospital from 2005 to 2009.

Election results

References

1978 births
Living people
Malaysian people of Malay descent
Malaysian Muslims
Malaysian United Indigenous Party politicians
21st-century Malaysian politicians
Members of the Malacca State Legislative Assembly